Mairbek Sheripov (1905 – November 7, 1942) was one of the leaders of Chechen insurgency against the Soviet Union in the 1940s.
Mairbek Sheripov was a younger brother of Aslanbek Sheripov, a Bolshevik revolutionary killed in a battle with the Denikinites in 1919. A jurist by profession, he worked for the Soviet government in the Chechen-Ingush ASSR. In 1941, he joined a Chechen insurrection led by Khasan Israilov. He was killed on November 7, 1942 in a Soviet reprisal raid.

References 

1905 births
1942 deaths
Chechen militants
Chechen nationalists
Chechen politicians
Chechen partisans in World War II
Chechen warlords
Chechen guerrillas killed in action
Chechen people
North Caucasian independence activists